Nova Esports is a professional esports organisation based in Hong Kong.  It was founded in September 2016. Nova Esports currently fields players in League of Legends: Wild Rift, Game for Peace, PUBG Mobile, Call of Duty: Mobile, Clash Royale, Brawl Stars, and FIFA 20.

Both the 2020 and 2021 PUBG Mobile Global Championships (PMGC) were won by Nova Esports' PUBG Mobile / Game for Peace squad, and they also won the Peace Eite Championship (PEC) twice.

History

Nova was initially a Clash Royale clan created in May 2016 by Anthony Yeung and his management team of Francis, Trevor, Jack, Niro and Richard. Later Oktay, Matthew and Steven joined the team. In September 2016 Nova was established as an esports organisation.

In 2020 Nova Esports International Limited was acquired by the Hong Kong listed company Imperium Group Global Holdings Limited.

In October 2019, Nova Esports won the first-ever Clash of Clans World Championships held in Hamburg, Germany. The team earned $250,000 as their winning prize.

Nova Esports became the first Brawl Stars world champion in November 2019. Nova Esports won the Brawl Stars World Finals 2019 held in Busan, South Korea.

In January 2021 Nova Esports' Game for Peace (Chinese version of PUBG Mobile) team won the PUBG Mobile Global Championship (PMGC) 2020, held in Dubai, UAE in online mode. The team won a total prize of $700,000.

Current divisions

League of Legends: Wild Rift

Prior to the global release of the game, Nova Esports, on 6 November 2020, announced that they will be hiring a League of Legends: Wild Rift roster which will be based in China and Europe.

On 9 July 2022, Nova Esports was crowned as the first champions of Wild Rift Global Icons Championship 2022. Nova Esports defeated J Team by a score of 4-0 in Best of 7. The team won a total prize of $640,000.

Roster

Game for Peace
On 9 July 2020, Nova Esports, in partnership with Chinese team X-Quest F, revealed their roster for Game for Peace, the Chinese version of PUBG Mobile, named Nova XQF.

On 23 August 2020, Nova XQF won the Peacekeeper Elite League (PEL) Season 2 and won over $140,000.

On 26 January 2021, Nova XQF won the PUBG Mobile Global Championship (PMGC) 2020. The team won a total prize of $700,000. Nova's Order (56 Kills) and Paraboy (44 Kills) were the second and third highest fraggers of the tournament respectively.

On 23 January 2022 Nova Esports won the PUBG Mobile Global Championship(PMGC) 2021. Team won a total prize of $1.53 Million.

Roster

PUBG Mobile
Alongside Game for Peace, Nova Esports also revealed their PUBG Mobile roster consisting of players from different countries.

Nova Esports placed second in the league stage of PUBG Mobile Pro League (PMPL) North America with a total of 497 points.

Roster

Call of Duty: Mobile
Nova Esports also has a Call of Duty: Mobile roster. This roster is based in Europe and consists of European players.

Roster

Clash Royale
Chenghui "Lciop" Huang represents Nova Esports in Clash Royale competitions. Lciop is Chinese.

On 1 November 2020, Nova Esports have won the Clash Royale League (CRL) East fall season 2020 and won prize $120,000. Lciop bagged the award for the Most Valuable Player (MVP) of the tournament.

Former divisions

PUBG Mobile
In June 2020, Nova Esports partnered with Indian eSports organisation GodLike's PUBG Mobile team. The team was named "Nova × GodLike" and participated in PUBG Mobile World League (PMWL) Eastern Division under this banner.

The partnership ended in September 2020 when PUBG Mobile was banned in India by the Government of India.

References

External links
 

2016 establishments in Hong Kong
Esports teams established in 2016
Sports teams in Hong Kong
Former Pacific Championship Series teams